Maryfield Aerodrome  is located adjacent to Maryfield, Saskatchewan, Canada.

See also 
 List of airports in Saskatchewan

References 

Registered aerodromes in Saskatchewan